The Classical Gazetteer is a short descriptive geographical dictionary by William Hazlitt (son of the critic William Hazlitt), written in 1851 and containing 15,000  places of Greek and Roman antiquity without citation of primary sources.

External links
 The Classical Gazetteer: A Dictionary of Ancient Geography, Sacred and Profane, Whittaker, 1851 on Google Books

1851 non-fiction books
Classical geography
Gazetteers